Stubbins is a surname and occasional given name. Notable people with the name include:

 Albert Stubbins (1919–2002), English footballer
 Hugh Stubbins (1912–2006), American architect
 Phil Stubbins (born 1962), English-born Australian football player and manager
 Stubbins Ffirth (1784–1820), American trainee doctor

Other uses
 George E. Stubbins House, in Britt, Iowa
 KlingStubbins, American corporation